Oronde Omari Bascome (born 8 March 1988) is a cricketer who has played six One Day Internationals and one Twenty20 International for Bermuda. His younger brother, Onais Bascome, has also played for Bermuda. In September 2019, he was named in Bermuda's squad for the 2019 ICC T20 World Cup Qualifier tournament in the United Arab Emirates.

References

External links 

1988 births
Living people
Bermuda One Day International cricketers
Bermuda Twenty20 International cricketers
Bermudian cricketers